Organic unity is the idea that a thing is made up of interdependent parts. For example, a body is made up of its constituent organs, and a society is made up of its constituent social roles. In Aristotle's Poetics he likened drama narrative's and action to organic form, presenting it as “a complete whole, with its several incidents so closely connected that the transposal or withdrawal of any one of them will disjoin and dislocate the whole.” The main theme of organic unity relies on a free-spirited style of writing and by following any guidelines or genre-based habits, the true nature of a work becomes stifled and unreliable on an artistic plane. The concept of organic unity gained popularity through the New Critics movement. Cleanth Brooks played an integral role in modernizing the organic unity principle. In The Well Wrought Urn, Brooks used the poem "The Canonization" by John Donne as an example to relate the importance of a work’s ability to flow and maintain a theme, so that the work gains momentum from beginning to end. Organic unity is the common thread that keeps a theme from becoming broken and disjointed as a work moves forward.

References

Literary concepts